Grease: The School Musical is a reality TV programme that appeared on British television at the end of August 2009 following on from the popular Hairspray: The School Musical. It was the result of a competition that started in 2008. The 1,000 schools were whittled down to 10 schools, then at this point filming started with the three judges (Zoe Tyler, Duncan James, and Stacey Haynes). There was then a competition and dance off with the final 3 schools (Shoeburyness High School, Great Barr School, and Wallasey School). Ray Quinn and Arlene Phillips appeared on the show as guests as well as Seth Rudeski.

In the end Wallasey school on the Wirral won.

The school went to London's West End to perform a shortened rehearsed version of Grease in the Novello theatre. They showed a series of one-hour shows and two added half-hour shows. The performance took place on 9 August 2009.

Many of the cast then went on to receive promotions to drama schools.  The final show was viewed by 1 million people.

References

External links 
Official programme website 
School website
Ray Quinns page

2000s British reality television series
2009 British television series debuts
Sky UK original programming
Grease (musical)